Wan Xiaoli (万晓利; born  1971) is a folk-rock singer, guitarist, and harmonica player from China.  He is originally from Ci County, Handan, Hebei but moved to Beijing in 1997.

He has released four albums.

Discography
2002 - 走过来走过去 (Walk Here, Walk There)
2004 - Badhead 3 (compilation)
2006 - 这一切没有想象的那么糟 (All the Things Are Better Than You Imagine)
2011 - 北方的北方 (The North Of The North)
2015 - 太阳看起来圆圆的 (The Sun Looks Round)
2017 - 天秤之舟/牙齿，菠菜和豆腐与诗人，流浪汉和门徒 (Ship of the Scales/Teeth, Spinach, and Tofu versus Poet, Tramp, and Disciple)

External links
Wan Xiaoli interview
Article

1971 births
Living people
Chinese male singer-songwriters
People from Handan
Place of birth missing (living people)
Musicians from Hebei
21st-century Chinese male singers